A psammosere is a seral community, an ecological succession that began life on newly exposed coastal sand. Most common psammoseres are sand dune systems.

In a psammosere, the organisms closest to the sea will be pioneer species: salt-tolerant species such as littoral algae and glasswort with marram grass stabilising the dunes. Progressing inland many characteristic features change and help determine the natural succession of the dunes. For instance, the drainage slows down as the land becomes more compact and has better soils, and the pH drops as the proportion of seashell fragments reduces and the amount of humus increases. Sea purslane, sea lavender, meadow grass and heather eventually grade into a typical non-maritime terrestrial eco-system. The first trees (or pioneer trees) that appear are typically fast-growing trees such as birch, willow or rowan. In turn these will be replaced by slow-growing, larger trees such as ash and oak. This is the climax community, defined as the point where a plant succession does not develop any further because it has reached equilibrium with the environment, in particular the climate.

In an idealised coastal psammosere model, at the seaward edge of the sand dune the pH of the soil is typically alkaline/neutral with a pH of 7.0/8.0 particularly where shell fragments provide a significant component of the sand. Tracking inland across the dunes a podsol develops with a pH of 5.0/ 4.0 followed by mature podsols at the climax with a pH of 3.5 - 4.5.

See also 
Halosere
Hydrosere
Lithosere
Psamment
Xerosere

External links 

 Case study of a psammosere

Ecological succession